Keystone Oaks School District is a small, public school district in suburban Pittsburgh, Pennsylvania. It was formed in 1965 after the merger of three smaller districts serving Dormont, Castle Shannon (except for a portion that is served by the Bethel Park School District), and Green Tree. The district's name refers to a "key" to a door for Dormont, a "stone" in a castle for Castle Shannon and the "oaks" of Green Tree.

According to 2000 federal census data, Keystone Oaks School District serves a resident population of 22,580 people.

The district operates five schools: Aiken Elementary (K-5 in Green Tree), Dormont Elementary (K-5 in Dormont), Myrtle Elementary (K-5 in Castle Shannon), Keystone Oaks Middle School, and Keystone Oaks High School.

References

School districts in Allegheny County, Pennsylvania
Education in Pittsburgh area